Mortal Kombat: Original Motion Picture Score is the instrumental score album released to accompany the Mortal Kombat film. The music was composed by George S. Clinton with additional guitar work provided by Buckethead and drums by Brain.

Clinton based his main themes on Japanese taiko drums, emphasizing the film's mystical atmosphere and Asian-influenced style. He used Shakuhachi flute, didgeridoos and a Tuvan throat singer to give the film a more exotic musical landscape than following traditional orchestral scores.

In a 2015 interview, Clinton said,

Clinton created the sound effect that suggests the presence of Shang Tsung in the film with a Tuvan throat singer which along with other segments of this score were used extensively in other film teasers and trailers, most notable in Roland Emmerich's Godzilla and the Final Destination franchise.

The album contains two tracks not used in the film named "Farewell" and "Kids". The latter can be heard at the end of the sequel Mortal Kombat: Annihilation.

Reception
Los Angeles Times critic Kevin Thomas characterized it as a "driving, hard-edged" score  and George S. Clinton went to receive a BMI Film award for his work in 1996.

Track listing
"A Taste of Things to Come"
"Liu Vs. Sub-Zero" featuring Buckethead
"It Has Begun"
"The Garden" featuring Buckethead
"Goro Vs. Art" featuring Buckethead
"Banquet" featuring Buckethead
"Liu Vs. Kitana"
"Liu's Dream" featuring Buckethead
"Liu Vs. Reptile" featuring Buckethead
"Stairway"
"Goro Goro" featuring Buckethead
"Kidnapped"
"Zooom" 
"Johnny Vs. Scorpion" featuring Buckethead
"Hand and Shadow" featuring Buckethead
"Scorpion and Sub-Zero" featuring Buckethead
"Soul Snatchin'"
"On the Beach" 
"Johnny Cage" featuring Buckethead
"Goro Chase" featuring Buckethead
"Evening Bells"
"Monks"
"Friends"
"Flawless Victory" featuring Buckethead
"Farewell"
"Kids"

References

Mortal Kombat music
1995 soundtrack albums
Film scores
Rykodisc soundtracks